Changyi Road is part of an interchange station of Lines 14 and 18 of the Shanghai Metro. Located at the intersection of Minsheng Road and Pudong Avenue in Pudong, Shanghai, the station opened on 30 December 2021, when both lines began operations. Its name is taken from the adjacent parallel street just north of the station, Changyi Road. It's one of the featured stations of the two lines, with tree-like structures and changing color lights, attracting passengers to take photos.

Station Layout

Gallery

References 

Railway stations in Shanghai
Shanghai Metro stations in Pudong
Line 14, Shanghai Metro
Line 18, Shanghai Metro
Railway stations in China opened in 2021